The 1916 Tempe Normal Owls football team was an American football team that represented Tempe Normal School (later renamed Arizona State University) as an independent during the 1916 college football season. In their third and final season under head coach George Schaeffer, the Owls compiled a 0–3 record and were outscored by their opponents by a combined total of 51 to 13. Archie Ivy was the team captain.

Schedule

References

Tempe Normal
Arizona State Sun Devils football seasons
College football winless seasons
Tempe Normal Owls football